Pandikoralalage Sunil Chandra de Silva (30 January 1941 – 28 February 2021) was the 35th Attorney General of Sri Lanka. He was appointed in 1988, succeeding Shiva Pasupati, and held the office until 1992. He was succeeded by Tilak Marapana.

References

External links
Sunil de Silva: unforgettable thespian by Dr Palitha Ganewatta

1941 births
2021 deaths
Attorneys General of Sri Lanka